Villa Park Dam is an embankment dam on Santiago Creek in Orange County, California in the United States. Along with the upstream Santiago Dam, the dam serves primarily for flood control for the cities of Villa Park, Orange, Tustin and Santa Ana and also regulates the inflow of Santiago Creek into the Santa Ana River. Construction was completed in 1963, and the dam is owned by the County of Orange.

Due to flood control requirements, the reservoir is typically at a very low level or empty during the dry season.

See also
List of dams and reservoirs in California

References

Buildings and structures in Orange County, California
Dams in California
Dams completed in 1963
United States local public utility dams